Arkansas Highway 168 (AR 168 and Hwy. 168) is an east–west state highway in Greene County, Arkansas. The route of  runs from Highway 228 east through Crowley's Ridge State Park to US Route 412 (US 412). A segment of the route composes the Crowley's Ridge Parkway.

Route description
Highway 168 begins at Highway 228 at Fontaine and runs east. The route runs through Loredo before forming a concurrency with Highway 141 (Crowley's Ridge Parkway) north to Walcott. Highway 141 continues north at a fork in the road, while Highway 168 turns northeast to Crowley's Ridge State Park. The Crowley's Ridge Parkway designation changes at this fork, following Highway 168 through the park. In the park, Highway serves the Crowley's Ridge Bathhouse, Comfort Station, Dining Hall, a historic bridge, and Walcot Lake. Further north, Highway 168 continues to US 412, where it terminates.

Major intersections

|-
| colspan=5 align=center |  concurrency north, 
|-

See also

 List of state highways in Arkansas

References

External links

168
Crowley's Ridge
Crowley's Ridge Parkway
Transportation in Greene County, Arkansas